Klenovica is a small fishing village in Croatia located between Senj and Novi Vinodolski. It is connected by the D8 highway.

The village has been there since the 17th century when it was known by the name of "Krmpocana" (part of Krmpote). The small fishing village is located (as the crow flies) 6km. south-east of Novi Vinodolski (10 km by road).
Klenovica has about 400 residents, including many famous fishermen. Some old wooden fishing boats can still be found in the small harbor, some of them are still being used. The number of people in Klenovica becomes much higher during the season when tourists arrive from all over the world.

In the past, people of Klenovica were entirely dependant on the sea for their livelihood. Nowadays the village is known as a peaceful and lovely tourist resort with long beaches and beautiful scenery providing an ideal place to relax and recreate and is especially a preferred holiday destination of families. Beach in Klenovica is pebbly and partly rocky, and considering that Klenovica is a small fishing village, even the furthest accommodation from the sea is only a few minutes walk to the beach.

There are 6 restaurants, a pizzeria, 4 bars, 3 shops, a petrol station, a post office and a camp in Klenovica.

Klenovica offers a hotel called "Villa Lostura", a number of private accommodations, about 500 beds, camping for about 2000 guests and of course, several restaurants with a wide choice fish and seafood. The gastronomic offer is a combination of coastal and Velebit tradition. The restaurants try to awaken the spirit of the rich past of fishermen. The most important restaurants are "Pod Orajom", a fish restaurant that lies directly in the Port, and other restaurants such as "Adriatic", "Školjić", "Stella Maris" and Pizzeria "Filipo".

The most specific thing about Klenovica are the sources of fresh water in the sea. Mixing of fresh and salt water favours the development of flora and fauna, therefore, in this area there is plenty of fish. The rough hinterland with a variety of woods and gray rock formations, as well as the natural coastline with cliffs and beaches are the precursors of Kapela and Velebit mountain (up to 1146m). Klenovica is a place where you can enjoy the clean sea, a warm climate and a mild sea breeze coming from the surrounding mountain Velebit.
Klenovica offers ideal conditions for rest and relaxation, escape from stress and tensions.

West of Klenovica is "Zrnovnica", a bay with a large freshwater source for the village Klenovica as well as Novi Vinodolski delivering drinking water.

Notes

External links
http://www.klenovica.eu
http://klenovica.net/

Populated places in Primorje-Gorski Kotar County